Fiona Mackay Barclay Bevan is an English singer-songwriter from Suffolk, who currently lives in London. She is noted for co-writing the song "Little Things" with Ed Sheeran which became a number-one single in 13 countries for One Direction, and for which Bevan and Sheeran received a BMI award.

Bevan has also co-written songs released by Kylie Minogue, LIGHTS, 5 Seconds Of Summer, Tom Walker, Steps, Mika, Shane Filan, Hey Violet, Natalie Imbruglia and has written and featured on Stefflon Don's debut release.

As an artist, Bevan's debut solo studio album Talk to Strangers (April 2014) was released on Navigator Records, and she has toured as support to Nick Mulvey, Ryan Keen, Ed Sheeran, Hawksley Workman, Ingrid Michaelson, Gwyneth Herbert, Luke Friend and Bill Bailey. In 2015 she completed a tour of Canada, supporting Hawksley Workman and the year before that Fiona completed a tour of Australia supporting Busby Marou. Bevan also runs a residency night at Servant Jazz Quarters, Dalston, London called "Fiona Bevan Presents" which has so far featured acts including Mercury Prize-nominated Sam Lee and Ed Harcourt, who also remixed her first single, "The Machine" in 2014.

Early life and education
Bevan is of British and Canadian parentage. Her great grandmother was romantic novelist D. E. Stevenson and Treasure Island author Robert Louis Stevenson was her great-great grandfather's cousin. She was born in Bulmer in Essex, brought up in Suffolk and went to Colchester County High School for Girls.

Solo career
Fiona Bevan's debut EP In The Swimming Pool was released in 2007. Her debut studio album Plant Your Heart was released in 2009 on the Fallen Idol label.

In 2011 she released an EP, Us and the Darkness, on Venus Climbing co-produced with Robin Baynton. It features Bevan on lead vocals and guitar accompanied by Rosalie Bevan on bass and James Crichlow on violin. One of the songs on the EP, "Dial D for Denial", was a semi-finalist at the 2011 International Songwriting Competition. The song "Pirates and Diamonds" was included on the OneTaste Collective Album Vol. 2, released on 14 June 2010, while she also appeared on Winter Hunter Remixes by The Living Graham Bond released on 26 July 2010 on the Fat label.

Her song "Love in a Cold Climate" was included on the For Folk's Sake Christmas 2011 compilation album.

Bevan's second album, Talk To Strangers was released in 2014 on Navigator Records in the UK, Planet Music in Australia and P-Vine in Japan. In 2015 it was released on Convexe / Universal Music in Canada, and Convexe in USA. The album's twelve songs were written by Fiona Bevan, arranged and played by Fiona Bevan and Shawn Lee produced by Shawn Lee and engineered by Pierre Duplan in Bloomsbury, London and mastered by George Horn at Fantasy Studios, San Francisco. The Guardian wrote "Bevan took us on startling odysseys that suggested Erykah Badu, Joanna Newsom and Kate Bush spine-tinglingly joined". The Line OF Best Fit called it "...mesmerisingly beautiful..."

The first single "The Machine" was remixed by Ed Harcourt and featured Fem Fel and received airplay on BBC Radio 1 and BBC London. Clash Music commentated about the track, "Fiona Bevan contrasts pastoral, acoustic textures with her golden, golden voice"

The next single, "Rebel Without A Cause", was released in May 2014, with remixes by Anushka, who are signed to Gilles Peterson's Brownswood Recordings, and Mr Hudson.

The single "They Sang Silent Night" was released in 2014 as a peacetime/Christmas song, marking the 100-year anniversary of the Christmas Truce ceasefire when enemy troops united in peace to sing Silent Night across the trenches. A live version of the song aired on Christmas Day on national ABC radio in Australia, featuring Fiona accompanied by Jeremy Marou from Busby Marou on guitar.

In December 2016, Fiona Bevan was featured on the Stefflon Don mix-tape Real Ting, with other artists such as Jeremih and Scouse Trappin Tremz. She wrote the song 'Forever' with Rymez and SteffLon Don, who was nominated for the BBC's Sound of 2017)

In February 2017, British newspaper The Observer selected Bevan's song "Sight of You" on the article "A history of the love song in 10 tracks", underscoring its importance in the digital era, especially for young music listeners, which "tackled the physical inadequacies many young women feel in the age of social media and told them they were OK to have". She commented that "it felt very important to write it like a feminist love song...Girls at that age – 12, 13, when their self-esteem is often rock bottom – need to hear those things said, so to hear them from their heroes is life-changing." Bevan received "hundreds of messages from girls on social media after the song grew in popularity.

Bevan released a new solo EP, Wild Angels, Sweet Demons on Laurel Canyon in 2018.

Collaborations

Ed Sheeran/One Direction
Bevan co-wrote the One Direction song "Little Things" with Ed Sheeran, which appeared on their second studio album Take Me Home (2012). In October 2012, Sheeran acknowledged her songwriting skills in an interview with British radio network Capital FM, stating: "The great thing about it is I wrote that song with a girl called Fiona Bevan when I was 17 and we lost the song. I've kept in touch with Fiona, we've done gigs and stuff and about two months ago she sent me the tune and was like, 'Oh, do you remember this?' I was like, 'Yeah, I do remember that', and I was in the studio with the One Direction boys at the time and I was playing it and they were like, 'We really like that'. It's got one of my favourite lines that I've ever written in a song."

Carl Ryden/Steps
In 2017, Fiona worked with the group Steps on their comeback album Tears on the Dancefloor. "Scared of the Dark", the single she and Carl Ryden co-wrote for Steps, reached number 37 on the UK Singles Chart.

Ben Haenow
Bevan co-wrote "One Night" for Ben Haenow with Ben and producer duo Red Triangle (production team) for his deluxe debut album. The album reached the top 10 in the UK and his subsequent 'One Night Tour' was also named after the track.

Gwyneth Herbert
Bevan co-wrote, with Gwyneth Herbert, two songs on Herbert's 2013 album The Sea Cabinet – "I Still Hear the Bells" and "The King's Shilling" – and performed with Herbert on the album and at its London launch at Wilton's Music Hall in May 2013.

Laura Welsh
With Laura Welsh, Bevan co-wrote the single 'Red' and 'Concrete' from the 'See Red EP' which The Line Of Best Fit called "stunning". Bevan also co-wrote Laura's previous single 'Sex and Violence' which was released as a 'Stream Only' premiere on Spin.com.

ARCO
With Neil Luck she co-composed music for, and performed alongside the avant-garde string ensemble ARCO on Last Wane Days (squib-box), a two-act monodrama for voice and ensemble, which was released on 12 March 2012. In a review, Tim Rutherford-Johnson said: "Bevan in particular can turn her voice on a dime. As co-composers, Luck and Bevan use sound and recurring motifs cleverly, so that the rampant dislocations achieve an unexpected coherence and continuity. Serious artistry".

Poussez Posse
For several months in 2011, Bevan was joint lead guitarist in the Poussez Posse, a band fronted by Georgina Baillie and mentored by Adam Ant. Fellow members included other lead guitarist Danie Cox (later known as Danie Centric and Gobby Holder), bassist Molly Spiers MacLeod (daughter of Spizz) and drummer Rachael Smith. The last three later left to form self-styled "flock rock" band The Featherz. This version of the Posse played several support slots for Ant in 2011 and recorded tracks for a planned single plus EP. It was replaced by a new line-up, still fronted by Baillie and including future Curse of Lono bassist Charis Anderson, which continued to support Ant on UK, mainland European and Australian tours until the end of 2012. Footage from 2011 of a band meeting of Bevan's lineup of the Poussez Posse at Ant's home is included in The Blueblack Hussar, a documentary about Ant directed by Jack Bond.

Music for advertisements and television
In the spring of 2015, Bevan's own track "Slo Mo Tiger Glo" from her album Talk To Strangers was chosen as the theme music for the HSBC adverts aired in the UK and Ireland. Her song "Beginners Luck" was used as the E! 2015 winter red carpet season USA track.

Discography

Songwriting credits
 indicates a background vocal contribution.

References

Living people
21st-century English women singers
21st-century English singers
English people of Canadian descent
English women singer-songwriters
People from Braintree District
Year of birth missing (living people)
English women guitarists
English pop guitarists
English pop pianists
English folk guitarists
Folk pianists
People educated at Colchester County High School
21st-century women pianists